Blattoidealestes is an extinct genus of therocephalian therapsid from the Middle Permian of South Africa. The type species Blattoidealestes gracilis was named by South African paleontologist Lieuwe Dirk Boonstra from the Tapinocephalus Assemblage Zone in 1954. Dating back to the Middle Permian, Blattoidealestes is one of the oldest therocephalians. It is similar in appearance to the small therocephalian Perplexisaurus from Russia, and may be closely related.

The holotype specimen of Blattoidealestes was discovered in 1918 in Prince Albert, Western Cape and cataloged as SAM 4321. SAM 4321 consists of a skull and partial postcranial skeleton. It was heavily distorted during fossilization and preparation, with the right side heavily eroded and most of the skull having been broken off from the main block. The snout is short and the eye sockets are very large. The lower jaw is slender, with a projection called the coronoid process very prominent. The skull bears many small teeth, including a pair of canines in the upper and lower jaws. Each postcanine tooth has lateral grooves on its surface, creating several small cusps. Cuspid teeth are common in Late Permian and Triassic therocephalians, and the closely related cynodonts, which are the ancestors of mammals, but no earlier theriodont possesses this type of tooth. Therefore, Blattoidealestes represents the oldest record of multicuspid teeth among theriodonts.

Although it is one of the earliest members of the group, Blattoidealestes is in a derived position among therocephalians. Due to its small size, Blattoidealestes was originally classified with other tiny therocephalians in a group called Scaloposauria. Scaloposauria has fallen out of use in recent years, and is now thought to represent a polyphyletic assemblage of juvenile therocephalians. Along with many other small-bodied "scaloposaurians", Blattoidealestes is now classified as a member of the advanced therocephalian clade Baurioidea.

References

Guadalupian synapsids of Africa
Ictidosuchids
Guadalupian synapsids
Guadalupian genus first appearances
Guadalupian genus extinctions